The Lichtscheid is the highest hill of the German city of Wuppertal.

See also
 List of mountains and hills in North Rhine-Westphalia

Mountains and hills of North Rhine-Westphalia